FictionJunction is a singing group that solely performs songs written by Japanese composer Yuki Kajiura. The term "FictionJunction" alone refers to this group; solo works between Kajiura and a vocalist are referenced by adding the singer's name after "FictionJunction". Although both perform under the FJ title and are collaborations with Kajiura, they are separate projects.

Background
Yuki Kajiura had been working on various soundtracks, including one for Mobile Suit Gundam SEED. In 2003, she released the solo album, Fiction. In 2004, she hired vocalist Yuuka Nanri to sing on some of her tracks, including "" which became a hit. In 2005, she added vocalists Kaori Oda, Keiko Kubota, and Wakana Ootaki, who each have their own project.

Kajiura does not consider the group to have "members". At Anime Expo 2012, she said: "To be honest, FictionJunction is not a 'group.' FictionJunction is just me. Well, actually, it depends on the music and the song. We have gathered several members and singers from everywhere. We don't have 'member' members. I *am* FictionJunction. But I am 'collecting' all the singers that are powerful and worthy to be in this group. They are true professionals, each individual here. I respect them, and I do look up to them. They have the most beautiful voices, and that's how they're selected."

Personnel
With the exception of Yuriko Kaida, each vocalist has had her own FictionJunction pre-title. Each vocalist's work is considered an individual project.  Some of Yuki Kajiura's vocalists now go by a capitalized names (e.g. Kaori Oda went by FictionJunction Kaori, but now goes by KAORI). At Anime Expo 2012, Kajiura brought vocalists Kaori, Keiko, Wakana and Yuriko Kaida to represent FictionJunction.

 FictionJunction Yuuka
 , as FictionJunction Yuuka, is Kajiura’s first, longest and best-known collaboration under the FictionJunction name, starting in 2004. The project was originally titled "FictionJunction featuring Yuuka", but the "featuring" part was later dropped to shorten the name. So far, they have released several singles and two full-length albums. Yuuka can also be heard in the soundtrack for Madlax.
 FictionJunction Kaori 
  joined the FictionJunction project in 2005. The duo performed two insert songs, "Tsubasa" and "dream scape", which were used in Tsubasa Chronicle.
 FictionJunction Keiko
She was also a member of Kajiura's singing group Kalafina.
 FictionJunction Wakana
  joined the FictionJunction project in 2005. They performed two songs for the original soundtrack of Fist of the North Star True Saviour Legend:  and the Japanese version of "Where the Lights Are" bonus track.  She sang "Paradise Regained" (an insert song for El Cazador de la Bruja) and in the Pandora Hearts soundtrack. She was also a member of Kalafina.
 
  first collaborated with Kajiura for the Noir anime soundtrack, in which she sang the songs that helped launched Kajiura's career: "canta per me," "salva nos" and "lullaby."  Since then Yuriko Kaida has provided vocals for many of Kajiura’s works, mainly as background chorus. Kaida became a main FictionJunction vocalist until 2009, upon the release of the album "Everlasting Songs" and the single "Parallel Hearts", lending her voice to “here we stand in the morning dew” and “Himitsu” in "Everlasting Songs" and providing vocals throughout the album.  She is the only vocalist in FictionJunction that uses her full name on stage.
 FictionJunction Asuka 
  performed "Everlasting Song", an insert song from anime series Elemental Gelade.  Originally sung in English, "Everlasting Song" was re-recorded in Japanese and released as a single in 2005. It reached No. 53 on the Oricon weekly chart and remained ranked for 3 weeks. Kato is working on her solo projects as Aira Yūki.

Other collaborations and groupings
 LiSA: She collaborated with the group for the song "From the Edge" under the name FictionJunction feat. LiSA.
 Joelle joined FictionJunction for their 2019 concert of music from the Princess Principal anime television series.

Musicians

 Yuki Kajiura – piano, vocals
   – guitar
  – drums
  – bass guitar
  – violin

  – manipulator (sound engineer)

Albums

Everlasting Songs

Everlasting Songs, announced November 20, 2008, features all FictionJunction vocalists: Yuuka, Keiko, Wakana, Kaori, Asuka, and Yuriko Kaida. It was released on February 25, 2009.

Track listing

Charts

FictionJunction 2008-2010 The Best of Yuki Kajiura Live 

The album contains recordings from Yuki Kajiura Live Vol.#2: 5. Tracks 1–4 on Disc 1 are from Yuki Kajiura Live Vol.#2. Tracks 5-8 are from Yuki Kajiura LIVE Vol.#3. Tracks 9-11 (FictionJunction Yuuka) and tracks 12-14 (FictionJunction) are from Yuki Kajiura Live Vol.#4: Everlasting Songs Tour 2009. The whole tracks of Disc 2 are new performances that have never been heard on DVDs and are from Yuki Kajiura Live Vol.#5: Japanese Seal SP Live. Hikaru of Kalafina and Yuriko Kaida performed the chorus in tracks 9–11 on Disc 1.

Track listing

Disc 1

Disc 2

Charts

Elemental 

Elemental, FictionJunction's second studio album, features Yuuka, Keiko, Wakana, Kaori, and Yuriko Kaida. It was released on January 22, 2014.

Track listing 

Charts

Parade 

Parade (stylized in upper cases), FictionJunction's third studio album, features ASCA, Keiko, LiSA, Joelle, Aimer, rito, Aira Yūki, Kaori, LINO LEIA, Eir Aoi, and Yuriko Kaida. It will be released on April 19, 2023.

Track listing

Singles

"Parallel Hearts" 
"Parallel Hearts" is a single featuring Yuriko Kaida, Keiko, Kaori and Wakana under the name FictionJunction. The title track was used as opening theme song for the anime television series Pandora Hearts.
Catalog Number
VTCL - 35065

Track listing.
"Parallel Hearts" (Pandora Hearts Opening Theme)
Vocalists: Kaori, Keiko, Wakana, Yuriko Kaida

Vocalist: Yuuka 
"Parallel Hearts: Instrumental"
"Hitomi no Chikara: Instrumental"

Charts

"Toki no Mukou Maboroshi no Sora" 
"Toki no Mukou Maboroshi no Sora" is FictionJunction's second single. The title track was used as opening theme song for the anime television series Ōkami Kakushi.

Track listing

Vocalists: Kaori, Keiko, Wakana, Yuriko Kaida

 Vocalist: Keiko
"Toki no Mukou Maboroshi no Sora: Instrumental"
"Nohara: Instrumental"

Charts

"stone cold" 

"stone cold" is FictionJunction's third single, released August 3, 2011. The title track was used as opening theme song for the anime television series Sacred Seven.

Track listing
"stone cold" (Sacred Seven Opening Theme)
 Vocalists: Kaori, Keiko, Wakana, Yuriko Kaida

 Vocalists: Kaori, Keiko
"stone cold -Instrumental-"
"Hitorigoto -Instrumental-"

Charts

"Distance" 

"Distance" is FictionJunction's fourth single. The title track was used as ending theme song for the HD remastered edition of the anime television series Mobile Suit Gundam SEED. The single was paired with the track "eternal blue", which was used as opening theme song for the PSP game Senritsu no Stratus.

Track listing
"Distance"
Vocalists: Kaori, Keiko, Wakana, Yuriko Kaida
"eternal blue"
Vocalists: Kaori, Keiko, Wakana, Yuriko Kaida 
"Distance -Instrumental-"
"eternal blue -Instrumental-"

Live DVDs

Yuki Kajiura  Live Vol.#2 2008.07.31

Yuki Kajiura Live Vol.#2 is Yuki Kajiura's first live concert released on DVD. It features the vocals of FictionJunction and guest vocalist Eri Itō.

FictionJunction Yuuka: Yuki Kajiura Live Vol.#4 Part I: Everlasting Songs Tour 2009

FictionJunction Yuuka: Yuki Kajiura Live Vol.#4 Part I: Everlasting Songs Tour 2009 features FictionJunction Yuuka (Yuuka Nanri) as main vocalist, and Yuriko Kaida and Hikaru Masai on chorus. The limited edition comes with a photo booklet and PV version of "Nostalgia". The DVD reached No. 49 on the Oricon charts and remained in the rankings for 2 weeks.

FictionJunction: Yuki Kajiura Live Vol.#4 Part II: Everlasting Songs Tour 2009

FictionJunction: Yuki Kajiura Live Vol.#4 Part II: Everlasting Songs Tour 2009 features the vocals of FictionJunction (Wakana Ootaki, Keiko Kubota, Kaori Oda, and Yuriko Kaida). The limited edition comes with a photo booklet and the PV version of "Parallel Hearts".

Others
FictionJunction sang a cover of "Gatherway" for the album Harvest, which was arranged by Kajiura and their live guitarist Koichi Korenaga.

References

External links
 FictionJunction JVC's Official Website 
 Official website 
 FictionJunction album 
 Yuki Kajiura's Official Site in English 
 FictionJunction Yuuka Home Page 
 Victor Entertainment (Yuki Kajiura) 
 Yuki Kajiura at Anime Wiki 
 canta-per-me.net: Unofficial Fan Site

Japanese pop music groups
Musical groups from Tokyo
Yuki Kajiura